The Lashkar Express runs between Lokmanya Tilak Terminus in Mumbai, Maharashtra and Agra Cantt. in Agra, Uttar Pradesh. It is a weekly train and runs from Mumbai on Fridays & from Agra Cantt. on Saturdays. The name "Lashkar" comes from Lashkar in Gwalior.

Route
Main towns on the way are Gwalior, Jhansi, Bhopal, Itarsi, Nashik. The train covers a distance of 1,334 km in 22 h 55 min.

Train No
Train number 12161: Mumbai to Agra Cantt., leaves Mumbai (Lokmanya Tilak Terminus) at 16:25 hrs on Fridays.
Train number 12162: Agra Cantt. to Mumbai, leaves Agra Cantt. at 23:50 hrs on Saturdays.
The train has a RSA with 12107-Mumbai Lucknow Superfast Express, 12173-LTT PBH Udyognagari Express and 12153 LTT Habibganj Express.
Coach Compositions are as follows-
For MUMBAI AGRA 12161-
Engine-SLR1-LD1-GEN1-GEN2-A1-B3-B2-B1-S11-PC1-S10-S9-S8-S7-S6-S5-S4-S3-S2-S1-UR3-SLR2.Total-22 Coaches.

Locomotion
Loco Link from LTT to Agra Cantt (Agc) is BSL WAP 4

Express trains in India
Trains from Agra
Transport in Mumbai
Rail transport in Maharashtra
Rail transport in Madhya Pradesh
Named passenger trains of India